Máximo Perrone (born 7 January 2003) is an Argentine professional footballer who plays as a defensive midfielder for Premier League club Manchester City and the Argentina national team.

Club career

Vélez Sarsfield
Perrone made his professional debut for Vélez Sarsfield on 6 March 2022 in match against Estudiantes. On 18 May 2022 he scored his first professional goal in Copa Libertadores match against Nacional.

Manchester City
On 23 January 2023, he signed on a five-and-a-half-year contract with Manchester City for around £8m, and would join the club following the conclusion of the South American U-20 Championship. On 25 February, he made his Premier League debut in a 4–1 away win over Bournemouth, replacing Erling Haaland in the 72nd minute.

International career
Perrone has played internationally for Argentina at under-16 and under-20 levels.

In March 2023, he received his first call-up to the Argentina senior national team by head coach Lionel Scaloni for two friendly matches against Panama and Curaçao.

Career statistics

Club

International

References

External links
 

2003 births
Living people
People from Buenos Aires
Argentine footballers
Association football midfielders
Argentine Primera División players
Club Atlético Vélez Sarsfield footballers
Manchester City F.C. players

Argentine expatriate footballers
Argentine expatriate sportspeople in England
Expatriate footballers in England